William John Pardon (25 September 1903 – 17 November 1969) was an Australian rules footballer who played with Collingwood in the Victorian Football League (VFL).

Family
The son of John Albert Pardon (1877-1947), and Francesca "Frances" Pardon (1875-1931), née Brocchi, William John Pardon was born at Daylesford, Victoria on 25 September 1903.

He married Delza May Lupton (1909-2004) in 1929.

Football
Recruited from the Red Cliffs Football Club in the Mildura and District Football League.

Death
He died at Parkville, Victoria on 17 November 1969.

Notes

References
 
 Castlemaine Preparations, The Weekly Times, (Saturday, 4 April 1931), p.54.

External links 

 		
 
 Billy Pardon's profile at Collingwood Forever

1903 births
1969 deaths
Australian rules footballers from Victoria (Australia)
Collingwood Football Club players
Castlemaine Football Club players